Robert Kafka Lehrer (March 13, 1929; Los Angeles-January 20, 2017; New York City) was a stage, motion picture and television actor.

Early years and education
Robert Lehrer was the son of Morris Lehrer, a Los Angeles pharmacist, and Charlotte Kafka. Robert received bachelor's and master's degrees from UCLA in theater arts. He earned a PhD in theater arts from Stanford University in 1962 with a dissertation entitled "Social Awareness in the Folk Plays of Carl Zuckmayer, 1925-1931." Lehrer served in the US Army during the Korean War.

Actor
Following a five-year apprenticeship with John Houseman's Professional Theater Group in Hollywood (which included a stint at CBS TV), Lehrer continued his acting career in Germany (over thirty-four years), doing commercials for the ZDF (Zweites Deutsches Fernsehen), creating voiceovers for HR Radio (Hessischer Rundfunk), as well as appearing in over thirty English-language stage productions. Lehrer returned to New York, appeared in many Off-Off-Broadway productions, and played Newton in The Private Life of Sir Isaac Newton. He had a principal role in a fall episode of the ABC sitcom Hope & Faith. He was also featured in the films Marie and Bruce, starring Julianne Moore and Matthew Broderick; Virgin (film) starring Elisabeth Moss; Descent (2007 film) starring Rosario Dawson; Our Italian Husband starring Brooke Shields.

References

External links

Robert Lehrer film clips
Robert Lehrer in Hope & Faith
Robert Lehrer in Marie and Bruce
Robert Lehrer in Virgin
Robert Lehrer in Descent
Robert Lehrer in Our Italian Husband
Robert Lehrer in Managing Patient Care 
Robert Lehrer as The Sunbather
Robert Lehrer in The Weekend
Robert Lehrer in A Four Letter Word
Robert Lehrer in Artemin Goldberg: Custom Tailor of Brassieres
Robert Lehrer 4 Minute Reel

1929 births
2017 deaths
Male actors from Los Angeles
American male film actors
American male stage actors
American male television actors
Stanford University alumni
University of California, Los Angeles alumni
People from Los Angeles